Jacob Ford was an American Revolutionary War officer, New York politician, and judge.

Early life

Jacob Ford was born April 22, 1744, in Hebron, Connecticut. He was married  on March 5, 1765, with Abigail Curtice and they had 10 children: Abigail, Jacob, Levina, Sylvester, Ansyl, Elijah, Olive, Isaac, Aaron, and Sally.

Career
Jacob Ford was commissioned Captain of the 4th Company in the 9th Regiment of Militia of Foot in the County of Albany. On October 20, 1775 he was Major of the same Regiment.
 
Major Ford took part in the Northern Campaign against the British troops commanded by General John Burgoyne, and was serving in that Campaign under General Philip Schuyler and General Horatio Gates during the Battles of Saratoga and was present when General Burgoyne surrendered on Oct.17, 1777. He was promoted to Lieutenant Colonel on May 28, 1778.
 
Lieutenant Colonel Jacob Ford resigned from the Albany County Militia on November 4, 1778. Ford was elected to the New York State Assembly from 1781-1785 as a representative of Albany County. In 1792 Jacob  was elected to the New York State Assembly to represent the newly formed Columbia County.

Jacob was appointed Justice of the Peace in 1786 and in 1801; was Associate Judge of the New York Court of Common Pleas in 1795, and was made first Judge the following year.

Death

Jacob Ford died July 24, 1837 at the age of 93. He is buried on the family farm in Austerlitz, New York.

References 

1744 births
1837 deaths
People from Hebron, Connecticut
People from Columbia County, New York
New York (state) militiamen in the American Revolution
Members of the New York State Assembly
18th-century American politicians
New York (state) state court judges
American justices of the peace
Burials in New York (state)